Kurban Razack (30 November 1912 – 13 September 1992) was a Trinidadian cricketer. He played in one first-class match for Trinidad and Tobago in 1934/35.

See also
 List of Trinidadian representative cricketers

References

External links
 

1912 births
1992 deaths
Trinidad and Tobago cricketers